"I Only Want My Love to Grow in You" is a song by English band Strawbs featured on their 1976  album Deep Cuts.

The song was written by Dave Cousins and Chas Cronk and was the first single to be released under their new deal with Oyster Records. This was the first single to be written by the Cousins/Cronk partnership and was chosen for its radio friendliness. Indeed it was BBC Radio 1's record of the week when released and got plenty of airplay. However, this did not translate into record sales

Release history

B-Side of the single
The B-side track "(Wasting My Time) Thinking of You" is another Cousins/Cronk composition also appearing on the album.

The B-side of the 1975 United States release is a monophonic version of the A-side.

Personnel
Dave Cousins – lead vocals, acoustic guitar
Dave Lambert – electric guitar, backing vocals
Chas Cronk – bass guitar, backing vocals
Rod Coombes – drums

with

Robert Kirby – mellotron
 John Mealing – piano

References
"I Only Want My Love to Grow in You" at Strawbsweb
Liner notes to Road Goes on Forever CD RGF/WCDCD 027 Deep Cuts/Burning for You

External links
Lyrics to "I Only Want My Love to Grow in You" at Strawbsweb
Lyrics to "(Wasting My Time) Thinking of You" at Strawbsweb

1976 singles
Strawbs songs
1976 songs
Songs written by Dave Cousins
Songs written by Chas Cronk